Bryan George Steil (born March 3, 1981) is an American attorney, businessman, and politician serving as the U.S. representative for Wisconsin's 1st congressional district. He is a member of the Republican Party.

Early life and education
Steil attended Joseph A. Craig High School in Janesville, Wisconsin, where he was born and raised. He earned his Bachelor of Science degree in business administration from Georgetown University, and his Juris Doctor from the University of Wisconsin School of Law.

Earlier career
In 2003, Steil spent a year working as an aide to U.S. Representative Paul Ryan. Before his election to Congress, Steil spent a decade in the manufacturing industry in southeast Wisconsin. He was an executive for plastics manufacturer Charter NEX Film. He also spent time working for Regal Beloit, spending a short stint in China while working for the company, and also spent time at McDermott Will & Emery as an attorney.

In 2016, Wisconsin Governor Scott Walker nominated Steil to the University of Wisconsin Board of Regents, and the Wisconsin State Senate unanimously approved him.

U.S. House of Representatives

Elections

2018 

Steil won the 2018 Republican primary in the race to succeed retiring incumbent and then Speaker of the House Paul Ryan in Wisconsin's 1st congressional district. He went on to face Democratic nominee Randy Bryce in the general election. During the campaign, Steil was endorsed by, among others, Ryan and Donald Trump. Steil defeated Bryce with 54.6% of the vote.

2020 

Steil was reelected in 2020 with 59.3% of the vote, defeating Democratic nominee Roger Polack.

2022 

Steil was reelected in 2022 with 54% of the vote, defeating Democratic nominee Ann Roe and Independent Charles Barman.

Tenure

Committee assignments 

 Committee on Financial Services
 Subcommittee on Diversity and Inclusion
 Subcommittee on Housing, Community Development and Insurance
 Subcommittee on Oversight and Investigations
 Task Force on Financial Technology
 Economic Disparity and Fairness in Growth (Select), Ranking Member

Caucus memberships 
 Republican Governance Group
Middle Class Jobs Caucus (Co-Chair)
Freshmen Working Group on Addiction
Future of Work Caucus (Founder/Co-Chair)
Republican Study Committee
Republican Main Street Partnership 
Problem Solvers Caucus

Political positions 
Steil has stated his top issues are workforce development, trade, and the student loan debt crisis. He opposes gun control measures, but supports funding for instant background checks.

Steil has stated that he favors making more trade partnerships with other countries. He has also advocated for more funding to be allocated to the region near the United States' southern border and wants price transparency in the medical industry. Steil is an opponent of abortion and supports overturning Roe v. Wade. In 2020, he voted against federal aid for paid sick leave related to the COVID-19 pandemic, which passed 363 to 41 in the House. He later voted for the December 2020 COVID-19 relief bill backed by then-President Trump, the fifth-largest piece of legislation in American history.

On January 6, 2021, Steil condemned the 2021 United States Capitol attack, but did not call for Trump's removal from office, voting against the subsequent impeachment resolution on January 13. He voted against the Republican-sponsored objections to Arizona's and Pennsylvania's electoral votes, thus helping to certify Joe Biden as the winner of the 2020 presidential election. In May, he voted against forming the January 6 commission to investigate the attack.

On July 19, 2022, Steil and 46 other Republican Representatives voted for the Respect for Marriage Act, which would codify the right to same-sex marriage in federal law.

Steil is currently the House Administration Chairman. Within this role, Steil helped oust a scandal-plagued Capitol official Brett Blanton.

Electoral history

2018

2020

2022

Personal life
Steil is a Catholic. In November 2020, he tested positive for COVID-19. Steil was born and raised in Janesville and attended Janesville Craig High School, Georgetown University, and the University of Wisconsin-Madison Law School.

References

External links
 Congressman Bryan Steil official U.S. House website
 Campaign website
 
 

|-

|-

|-

|-

1981 births
McDonough School of Business alumni
Living people
Politicians from Janesville, Wisconsin
Republican Party members of the United States House of Representatives from Wisconsin
University of Wisconsin Law School alumni
Wisconsin lawyers
21st-century American politicians
Catholics from Wisconsin
Joseph A. Craig High School alumni
American Roman Catholics